Igor Plotnikov is a paralympic swimmer from Russia competing mainly in category S6 events.

Career 
Igor travelled with the Russian Paralympic swimming team to two Paralympics games, first in 2004 and then in 2008.  At the 2004 games he competed in the 50m freestyle finishing eighth in the final, won silver in the 50m Butterfly despite being the fastest in the heats with a new world record and broke the world record in the heats and final on his way to winning gold in the 100m backstroke.  At the 2008 games he was part of the Russian team that finished sixth in the 4 × 100 m medley, he also finished in the same position in the 50m butterfly, failed to make the final of the 400m freestyle but did defend his title in the 100m backstroke

References

External links
 

Paralympic swimmers of Russia
Swimmers at the 2004 Summer Paralympics
Swimmers at the 2008 Summer Paralympics
Paralympic gold medalists for Russia
Paralympic silver medalists for Russia
Russian male backstroke swimmers
People without hands
Living people
Medalists at the 2004 Summer Paralympics
Medalists at the 2008 Summer Paralympics
Year of birth missing (living people)
Medalists at the World Para Swimming European Championships
Paralympic medalists in swimming
Russian male butterfly swimmers
20th-century Russian people
21st-century Russian people